John Martin Mannion (26 October 1944 – 2 April 2006) was an Irish Fine Gael politician from Clifden, County Galway. He was a Teachta Dála (TD) for four years and a senator for 10 years.

A farmer, auctioneer and businessman before entering politics, Mannion was a long-serving member of Galway County Council, and of the Western Health Board. He was elected in 1969 to the 12th Seanad by the Agricultural Panel, succeeding his father, John Mannion Snr, who had first been elected to the Seanad in 1954.

Like his father before him, Mannion found Connemara a difficult base from which seek election to the Dáil. The Galway West constituency includes the city of Galway and the western part of the county, and Fine Gael support is stronger in the city than in Connemara. His father had won a seat in Dáil Éireann on his first attempt but was not re-elected in four further attempts. Mannion junior stood unsuccessfully for the Dáil at the 1973 general election, but in the subsequent Seanad election he was returned to the 13th Seanad. He was defeated again in the 1975 by-election, but won the seat at the 1977 general election, ousting the sitting Fine Gael TD Fintan Coogan Snr in a year which was otherwise a landslide victory for Fianna Fáil.

Again like his father, Mannion served only one term in the Dáil; he did not contest the 1981 general election and did not stand for the Dáil again. However, he was re-elected in 1981 to the 15th Seanad and in 1982 to the 16th Seanad, and retired from the Oireachtas at the 1983 Seanad election. In later years he was crippled with arthritis, and died in 2006, aged 62.

See also
Families in the Oireachtas

References

1944 births
2006 deaths
Fine Gael TDs
Members of the 21st Dáil
Members of the 12th Seanad
Members of the 13th Seanad
Members of the 15th Seanad
Members of the 16th Seanad
Local councillors in County Galway
Politicians from County Galway
Fine Gael senators